Carex scitiformis is a tussock-forming perennial in the family Cyperaceae. It is native to parts of Japan.

See also
 List of Carex species

References

scitiformis
Plants described in 1905
Taxa named by Georg Kükenthal
Flora of Japan